Kyle J. Mullins is an American politician. He is a Democrat representing District 112 in the Pennsylvania House of Representatives.

Political career 

In 2018, Mullins ran to represent District 112 in the Pennsylvania House of Representatives, replacing former representative Kevin Haggerty, who decided not to run for another term. Mullins won a five-way Democratic primary with 43.3% of the vote, and went on to win the general election against Republican Ernest Lemoncelli. Mullins is running for re-election in 2020.

As of June 2020, Mullins sits on the following committees:
 Committee on Committees
 Game & Fisheries
 Professional Licensure
 Transportation

Electoral record

References 

Democratic Party members of the Pennsylvania House of Representatives
Living people
Year of birth missing (living people)
21st-century American politicians